This list of guitarists includes notable musicians, known principally for their guitar playing, for whom there is an article in Wikipedia. Those who are known mainly as bass guitarists are listed separately at List of bass guitarists.

A

Johnny A.
Abbath Doom Occulta (ex-Immortal, ex-I, Abbath)
"Dimebag" Darrell Abbott (Pantera)
Drew Abbott
John Abercrombie
Aaron "El Hefe" Abeyta (NOFX)
Mick Abrahams (Jethro Tull)
William Ackerman
Bryan Adams
Stuart Adamson (The Skids, Big Country, The Raphaels)
Marcus Adoro (Eraserheads)
Dionisio Aguado
Salman Ahmad
Mikael Åkerfeldt (Opeth, Storm Corrosion)
Fredrik Åkesson (Opeth)
Jan Akkerman (Focus)
Damon Albarn (Blur, Gorillaz)
Nate Albert (The Mighty Mighty Bosstones, The Kickovers)
Steve Albini (Big Black, Rapeman, Shellac)
Art Alexakis (Everclear)
Michael Algar (Toy Dolls)
Carson Allen
Kris Allen
Paul Allender (Cradle of Filth)
Duane Allman (The Allman Brothers Band)
Laurindo Almeida
Carlos Alomar (David Bowie)
Vicente Amigo
Michael Amott (Arch Enemy)
Christopher Amott (ex-Arch Enemy, Armageddon)
Trey Anastasio (Phish)
Ian Anderson (Jethro Tull)
Muriel Anderson
Magnus Andersson
Nicke Andersson (Hellacopters, Supershit 666)
André 3000 (Outkast)
Jake Andrews
Celeina Ann (Carole & Tuesday)
Faraz Anwar (Mizraab)
Gem Archer (Heavy Stereo, Oasis)
Jamie Arentzen (American Hi-Fi)
Joan Armatrading
Armik
Billie Joe Armstrong (Green Day, Pinhead Gunpowder, Foxboro Hot Tubs, The Network)
Tim Armstrong (Operation Ivy, Rancid, Transplants)
Joseph Arthur
Paul Arthurs (Oasis)
Jeff Arwadi (Altera Enigma, Kekal)
Carl Asercion
Daniel Ash (Bauhaus, Tones on Tail, Love and Rockets)
DJ Ashba (BulletBoys, Beautiful Creatures, Sixx:A.M.)
Peter Asher (Peter and Gordon)
Ron Asheton (The Stooges)
Gwyn Ashton
John Ashton (The Psychedelic Furs)
Sérgio Assad
Gustavo Assis-Brasil
Chet Atkins
Paul Atkinson (The Zombies)
Dan Auerbach (The Black Keys)
Doug Aldrich (Whitesnake)

B

Jim Babjak (The Smithereens)
Ayub Bachchu (Love Runs Blind)
Matt Bachand (Shadows Fall)
Randy Bachman (Bachman–Turner Overdrive, The Guess Who)
Derek Bailey
Dave Bainbridge (Iona)
Ian Bairnson (Pilot, The Alan Parsons Project, Kate Bush)
Brian Baker (Minor Threat, Dag Nasty, Bad Religion)
Mickey Baker
Dave Baksh (Sum 41, Brown Brigade)
David Ball (Soft Cell)
Balsac the Jaws of Death (GWAR)
Bruce Bouillet (Racer X)
Terry Balsamo (Evanescence)
Perry Bamonte (The Cure)
Devendra Banhart
Benji Madden (Good Charlotte)
Paul Banks (Interpol)
Peter Banks (Yes)
Carl Barât (The Libertines, Dirty Pretty Things)
Barbecue Bob
Warren Barfield
Don Barnes (38 Special)
Martin Barre (Jethro Tull)
Paul Barrere (Little Feat)
Syd Barrett (Pink Floyd)
Agustín Barrios
Nicholas Barron
Steve Bartek (Oingo Boingo)
Desireé Bassett
Joshua Bassett
Michael Angelo Batio (Nitro)
Jennifer Batten
Roland Bautista (Earth, Wind & Fire)
Jeff "Skunk" Baxter (Steely Dan, The Doobie Brothers)
Brendan Bayliss (Umphrey's McGee)
Eric Bazilian (The Hooters)
Reb Beach (Winger, Whitesnake)
Michael Bearpark (Darkroom, No-Man)
Corey Beaulieu (Trivium)
Beck
Jeff Beck (The Yardbirds, The Jeff Beck Group, Beck, Bogert & Appice)
Joe Beck
Justin Beck (Glassjaw)
Joe Becker
Jason Becker (Cacophony, David Lee Roth)
Walter Becker (Steely Dan)
Peter Beckett (Player)
Johanna Beisteiner
Adrian Belew (King Crimson, The Bears; Talking Heads, David Bowie, Frank Zappa)
Drake Bell
Brian Bell (Weezer, Space Twins, The Relationship)
Eric Bell (Thin Lizzy)
J.J. Belle
Matthew Bellamy (Muse)
Dustin Belt (Heffron Drive)
Roni Benise
Bob Bennett
Chester Bennington (Linkin Park)
Brendan Benson (The Raconteurs)
George Benson
Miki Berenyi (Lush)
Peter Bernstein
Chuck Berry
Guy Berryman (Coldplay)
Gene Bertoncini
Nuno Bettencourt (Extreme)
Dickey Betts (The Allman Brothers Band)
Randall Bewley (Pylon)
Bo Bice
Big Tom
Kat Bjelland (Babes in Toyland)
Anders Björler (At the Gates, The Haunted)
Ivar Bjørnson (Enslaved)
Clint Black
Jack Black (Tenacious D)
Ryland Blackinton (Cobra Starship)
Ritchie Blackmore (Deep Purple, Rainbow, Blackmore's Night)
Tony Blair
Zach Blair (Hagfish, GWAR, Only Crime, Rise Against)
Blind Blake
Norman Blake
Norman Blake (Teenage Fanclub)
Ron Block (Alison Krauss)
Conny Bloom (Hanoi Rocks)
Mike Bloomfield
Bob Bogle (The Ventures)
John Bohlinger (musician)
Marc Bolan (T.Rex)
Marcie Bolen (The Von Bondies)
Tommy Bolin (Deep Purple)
Joe Bonamassa
Bono (U2)
Nicke Borg (Backyard Babies)
Adrian Borland (The Sound)
Wes Borland (Limp Bizkit)
Mark Boston (Captain Beefheart and his Magic Band)
Jean-Paul Bourelly
Tony Bourge (Budgie (band))
James Bourne (Son of Dork)
Pierre Bouvier (Simple Plan)
Robert Bowlin
James Bowman (Against Me!)
Will Boyd (American Princes)
Mick Box (Uriah Heep)
James Dean Bradfield (Manic Street Preachers)
Michelle Branch (The Wreckers)
Laurent Brancowitz (Phoenix)
Srđan Branković (Alogia)
Vito Bratta (White Lion)
Creed Bratton (The Grass Roots)
Jacques Brautbar (Phantom Planet)
Julian Bream
Lenny Breau
Thomas Bredahl (Volbeat)
Thom Bresh
Paul Brett
Mike Brewer
John Brewster (The Angels)'s
Lincoln Brewster
Vic Briggs (Eric Burdon & The Animals)
Terry Britten
Chris Broderick (Megadeth)
Dave Brock (Hawkwind)
Isaac Brock (Modest Mouse, Ugly Casanova)
David Bromberg
Devin Bronson (Avril Lavigne, Kelly Clarkson)
Michael Brook
Garth Brooks
Kix Brooks (Brooks & Dunn)
Meredith Brooks
Big Bill Broonzy
Bobby Broom
Ethan Brosh
Eric Brosius (Tribe)
Drew Brown (OneRepublic)
Mike Brown
Jackson Browne (Nitty Gritty Dirt Band)
Bob Brozman
Norman Brown
Oli Brown (RavenEye)
Michael Bruce (Alice Cooper)
Jimmy Bruno
Mark Bryan (Hootie & the Blowfish)
Roy Buchanan
Peter Buck (R.E.M.)
Buckethead (Guns N' Roses, Praxis, Deli Creeps, Colonel Claypool's Bucket of Bernie Brains)
Lindsey Buckingham (Fleetwood Mac)
Jonny Buckland (Coldplay)
Jeff Buckley
Ely Buendia (Eraserheads Pupil)
Jimmy Buffett
Charlie Burchill (Simple Minds)
Ben Burnley (Breaking Benjamin)
Christian Burns (BBMak)
Jake Burns (Stiff Little Fingers)
Vinny Burns (Ten)
R. L. Burnside
Kenny Burrell
James Burton (Ricky Nelson, Elvis Presley, John Denver)
Kristian Bush (Sugarland)
Bernard Butler (Suede, The Tears)
John Butler (John Butler Trio)
Jonathan Butler
Damon Buxton
Glen Buxton (Alice Cooper)
Roddy "Radiation" Byers (The Specials)
Charlie Byrd
David Byrne (Talking Heads)

C

Fito Cabrales (Platero y Tú, Fito & Fitipaldis)
Kevin Cadogan (Third Eye Blind)
Chris Caffery (Trans-Siberian Orchestra)
Charlotte Caffey (The Go-Go's)
Paul Caiafa (The Misfits, Kryst the Conqueror, Gorgeous Frankenstein)
Colbie Caillat
Al Caiola
J. J. Cale
Randy California (Spirit)
Jo Callis (The Rezillos, The Human League)
Greg Camp (Smash Mouth)
Jeremy Camp
Glen Campbell
Mike Campbell (Tom Petty and the Heartbreakers)
Phil Campbell (Motörhead)
Royce Campbell
Vivian Campbell (Dio, Whitesnake, Def Leppard)
Mike Campese
Jim Campilongo
Jerry Cantrell (Alice in Chains)
Joey Cape (Me First and the Gimme Gimmes, Bad Astronaut)
Captain Sensible (The Damned)
Matteo Carcassi
Larry Carlton
Jesse Carmichael (Kara's Flowers)
Sabrina Carpenter
Stephen Carpenter (Deftones)
Pete Carr
Chris Carrabba (Dashboard Confessional, Further Seems Forever)
Kim Carroll
John Valentine Carruthers (Siouxsie and the Banshees)
Maybelle Carter (Carter Family)
Ferdinando Carulli
Neko Case (The New Pornographers)
Al Casey (jazz guitarist)
Al Casey (rock guitarist)
Johnny Cash
Nick Catanese (Black Label Society)
Philip Catherine
Stephen Caudel
Max Cavalera (Sepultura, Soulfly, Cavalera Conspiracy, Nailbomb)
Dino Cazares (Fear Factory, Divine Heresy)
Danny Cedrone (Bill Haley & His Comets) 
Gustavo Cerati (Soda Stereo)
Franco Cerri
Nic Cester (Jet)
Yavuz Çetin
Eugene Chadbourne
António Chainho
Bill Champlin (Sons of Champlin)
Eason Chan
Jaycee Chan
Jerry Chang
Gary Chapman
Manny Charlton (Nazareth)
Charo
David Chastain (Chastain)
Rhys Chatham
Chris Cheney (The Living End)
Andrew Cheshire
Phil Chevron (The Pogues)
Moraito Chico
Michael Guy Chislett (The Academy Is..., Hillsong United)
Jay Chou
John Christ (Danzig)
Charlie Christian (Benny Goodman)
Stephen Christian (Anberlin)
Popa Chubby
Don Ciccone (Frankie Valli and the Four Seasons, The Critters)
Martin Cilia (The Atlantics)
Jake Cinninger (Umphrey's McGee)
John Cipollina (Quicksilver Messenger Service)
Liam Clancy (The Clancy Brothers, Makem and Clancy)
Eric Clapton (John Mayall & the Bluesbreakers, The Yardbirds, Cream, Blind Faith, Derek and the Dominos)
Angus Clark (Trans-Siberian Orchestra)
Gary Clark Jr.
Mike Clark (Suicidal Tendencies)
Roy Clark
Steve Clark (Def Leppard)
"Fast" Eddie Clarke (Motörhead)
Gilby Clarke (Guns N' Roses, Rock Star Supernova)
Frank Claussen (Theatre of Tragedy)
Zal Cleminson (Sensational Alex Harvey Band)
Henry Cluney (Stiff Little Fingers)
Kurt Cobain (Nirvana)
Eddie Cochran
Stephen Cochran
Bruce Cockburn
Leonard Cohen
Sam Cohen
Jesse Colburn (Avril Lavigne)
Deborah Coleman
Johnny Colla (Huey Lewis and the News)
Phil Collen (Def Leppard)
Ned Collette
Chris Collingwood (Fountains of Wayne)
Albert Collins
Allen Collins (Lynyrd Skynyrd)
John Collins (The New Pornographers, The Evaporators)
Paul Collins (The Beat)
Paul Colman (Newsboys, Paul Colman Trio)
Gary Lee Conner (Screaming Trees)
John Connolly (Sevendust)
Bill Connors
Nico Constantine (Madfly, Comes with the Fall)
Steve Conte (New York Dolls), (Eric Burdon)
Ry Cooder (Captain Beefheart and his Magic Band, The Seeds)
Jamie Cook (Arctic Monkeys)
Jesse Cook
Kyle Cook (Matchbox Twenty, The New Left)
Mike Cooley (musician) (Drive-by Truckers)
Rusty Cooley (Dominion, Outworld)
Gaz Coombes (Supergrass)
John Corabi (Angora, The Scream, Mötley Crüe, Union)
Francesco Corbetta
Easton Corbin
Billy Corgan (The Smashing Pumpkins)
Chris Cornell (Soundgarden)
Gene Cornish (The Rascals, Fotomaker)
Hugh Cornwell (The Stranglers)
Jim Corr (The Corrs)
Larry Coryell
Miranda Cosgrove
Yamandu Costa
Napoléon Coste
Sean Costello
Elizabeth Cotten
Jeff Cotton (Captain Beefheart and his Magic Band)
Andy Cox (The Beat, Fine Young Cannibals)
Laura Cox
Graham Coxon (Blur)
Jonathan Coulton
Steve Cradock
Andrew Craighan (My Dying Bride)
Philo Cramer (Fear)
Dan Crary
Robert Cray
Marshall Crenshaw
Jim Croce
Kevin Cronin (REO Speedwagon)
Jason Cropper (Weezer)
Steve "The Colonel" Cropper (The Mar-Keys, Booker T. & the M.G.'s)
David Crosby (Crosby, Stills, Nash & Young, The Byrds)
Robbin Crosby (Ratt)
Sheryl Crow
Allison Crowe
András Csáki
Josh Cunningham (The Waifs)
Rivers Cuomo (Weezer, Avant Garde, Homie)
Shannon Curfman
John Curulewski (Styx)
Billy Ray Cyrus
Miley Cyrus
Trace Cyrus

D

Britt Daniel (Spoon, Divine Fits)
Dante DeCaro (Hot Hot Heat, Johnny and the Moon)
Denis D'Amour (Voivod)
Donnie Dacus
Marcel Dadi
Aaron Dalbec (Bane, Only Crime)
Dick Dale
Brody Dalle (The Distillers)
Sean Danielsen (Smile Empty Soul, World Fire Brigade)
Jol Dantzig (Wilson Pickett, Shaw Blades, Jim Carroll)
Glenn Danzig (Danzig)
Lenny Davidson (The Dave Clark Five)
Dave Davies (The Kinks)
Ray Davies (The Kinks)
Brad Davis (musician)
Reverend Gary Davis
Jesse Ed Davis
Keeley Davis (Denali, Engine Down)
Maura Davis (Denali)
Mike Davis (Nocturnus)
Mike Dawes
Christopher Dean
Mahyar Dean (Angband)
Nicolas de Angelis
Chris de Burgh
Marco Aurelio Zani de Ferranti
Chris DeGarmo (Queensrÿche)
Vance DeGeneres (Cowboy Mouth)
Reina del Cid
Dean DeLeo (Talk Show, Stone Temple Pilots)
Tom DeLonge (Blink-182, Box Car Racer, Angels & Airwaves)
Warren DeMartini (Ratt)
Dave Dederer (The Presidents of the United States of America)
Brad Delp (Boston)
Brad Delson (Linkin Park)
Paul Dempsey (Something for Kate)
Tommy Denander (Michael Jackson, Paul Stanley, Alice Cooper, Ricky Martin, Toto)
Duane Denison (The Jesus Lizard, Tomahawk, Firewater)
Tom Denney (A Day To Remember)
John Denver
Johnny Depp
Amir Derakh (Orgy, Julien-K, Rough Cutt)
Rick Derringer (The McCoys, Johnny Winter, Edgar Winter)
Jason De Ron (Altera Enigma, Paramaecium)
Marko DeSantis (Sugarcult)
C.C. DeVille (Poison)
Mat Devine (Kill Hannah)
Tommy DeVito (The Four Seasons)
Roberto Diana
Dennis "Denny" Dias, Steely Dan
Alirio Díaz
Diblo Dibala
Bo Diddley
Dido
Ani DiFranco
Steve Diggle (Buzzcocks)
Al Di Meola (Return to Forever, Go)
Pete Doherty (The Libertines, Babyshambles)
Peter Dolving (Mary Beats Jane, The Haunted)
Dan Donegan (Disturbed)
Donovan
Edsel Dope (Dope)
Paul Dorrington
Paul Doucette (Matchbox Twenty)
Captain Kirk Douglas (The Roots)
Jerry Douglas
K. K. Downing (Judas Priest)
Dr. Know (Bad Brains)
Nick Drake
Pete Drake
Dregen (Backyard Babies, The Hellacopters)
Bruce Driscoll (Blondfire, Brookville)
Glen Drover (Megadeth, King Diamond, Eidolon)
Steven Drozd (The Flaming Lips)
Ian D'Sa (Billy Talent)
Chris Duarte
Les Dudek
Billy Duffy (The Cult)
Jan Dumée (Focus, On the Rocks)
Tom Dumont (No Doubt, Invincible Overlord)
Gary Duncan (Quicksilver Messenger Service)
Andy Dunlop (Travis)
Ronnie Dunn (Brooks & Dunn)
Kyle Bobby Dunn
Francis Dunnery (It Bites)
Jesse James Dupree (Jackyl)
Sherri DuPree (Eisley)
William DuVall (Neon Christ, Madfly, Comes with the Fall, Alice in Chains)
Adam Dutkiewicz (Killswitch Engage)
Roland Dyens
Doyle Dykes
Bob Dylan
Jakob Dylan (The Wallflowers)
Jerry Donahue

E

Ronnie Earl
Steve Earle
Elliot Easton (The Cars, The New Cars)
Duane Eddy
The Edge (U2)
Dave Edmunds
Kathleen Edwards
Nokie Edwards (The Ventures)
Richey Edwards (Manic Street Preachers)
Kian Egan (Westlife)
Stephen Egerton (Descendents)
Eduardo Egüez
Hucky Eichelmann
Mike Einziger (Incubus)
Tripp Eisen (Static-X, Dope, Murderdolls)
Mattias Eklundh (Freak Kitchen)
Danny Elfman (Oingo Boingo)
Lindsay Ell
Dolan Ellis
Herb Ellis
John Ellis (The Stranglers)
Justin Emerle (Echo Orbiter)
Tommy Emmanuel
Rik Emmett (Triumph), (Solo)
John Engelbert (Johnossi)
Eric Erlandson (Hole)
Sully Erna (Godsmack)
Omar Espinosa (Escape the Fate, LoveHateHero)
Esteban
Kevin Eubanks
Euronymous (Mayhem)
Dennis Eveland
Jason Everman (Nirvana, Soundgarden)
George Ezra

F

John Fahey
Bruce Fairweather (Mother Love Bone, Green River)
Nick Falcon (The Young Werewolves)
Todd Fancey (The New Pornographers)
Bernard Fanning (Powderfinger)
Tal Farlow
Mark Farner (Grand Funk Railroad)
John Farrar (The Shadows)
Andrew Farriss (INXS)
Tim Farriss (INXS)
Josh Farro (Paramore)
Eric Faulkner (Bay City Rollers)
Newton Faulkner
Don Felder (Eagles)
José Feliciano
Jay Ferguson (Sloan)
Jeremy "Jinxx" Ferguson (Black Veil Brides)
Jim Ferguson
Dean Fertita Queens of the Stone Age, The Waxwings The Dead Weather
Roger C. Field
Scott Fields
Zach Filkins (OneRepublic)
Robin Finck (Nine Inch Nails, Guns N' Roses)
Jon Finn (Jon Finn Group)
Michael Lee Firkins
Jörg Fischer (Accept)
Bradley Fish
Samantha Fish
Roger Fisher (Heart)
Eliot Fisk
Warren Fitzgerald (Oingo Boingo, The Vandals)
John Flansburgh (They Might Be Giants)
Lester Flatt (Bill Monroe and his Blue Grass Boys, Foggy Mountain Boys, Nashville Grass)
Flattus Maximus (GWAR)
Tom Fletcher (McFly)
Brandon Flowers (The Killers)
Robb Flynn (Machine Head)
William Foden
John Fogerty (Creedence Clearwater Revival)
Tom Fogerty (Creedence Clearwater Revival)
Ben Folds (Ben Folds Five)
Sue Foley
Jerome Fontamillas (Switchfoot)
Lita Ford (The Runaways)
Marc Ford (The Black Crowes)
Robben Ford
Chris Foreman (Madness)
Jon Foreman (Switchfoot)
Richard Fortus (The Psychedelic Furs, Love Spit Love, Guns N' Roses)
François de Fossa
Rick Foster
Alex Fox
Oz Fox (Stryper, SinDizzy)
Les Fradkin (Beatlemania (musical))
Peter Frampton (Humble Pie, The Herd)
Black Francis (Pixies)
Lars Frederiksen (Rancid, Lars Frederiksen and the Bastards)
Ace Frehley (KISS)
Jay Jay French (Twisted Sister)
Glenn Frey (Eagles)
Matthew Friedberger (The Fiery Furnaces)
Marty Friedman (Megadeth, Cacophony)
Bill Frisell
Robert Fripp (King Crimson)
Fred Frith (Henry Cow, Art Bears)
Edgar Froese (Tangerine Dream)
Uri Frost (Katamine)
John Frusciante (Red Hot Chili Peppers)
Koichi Fukuda (Static-X)
Bobby Fuller (The Bobby Fuller Four)
Jim Fuller (The Surfaris)
Justin Furstenfeld (Blue October, The Last Wish)
Nelly Furtado
Magne Furuholmen (a-ha)

G

Steve Gaines (Lynyrd Skynyrd)
Declan Galbraith
Eric Gale
Eric Gales
Noel Gallagher (Oasis)
Rory Gallagher
Shane Gallagher (+44)
Cliff Gallup
Frank Gambale
Tim Gane (Stereolab)
Sunil Ganguly
Charly García (Sui Generis, Porsuigieco, La Máquina de Hacer Pájaros, Serú Girán)
Jerry Garcia (Grateful Dead)
Ricardo Garcia
Roopam Garg
Chuck Garvey (moe.)
Kyle Gass (Tenacious D)
Diego del Gastor
Synyster Gates (Avenged Sevenfold, Pinkly Smooth)
Danny Gatton
Dick Gaughan
Eelco Gelling (Cuby + Blizzards, Golden Earring)
Björn Gelotte (In Flames)
Joseph Genaro (The Dead Milkmen)
Vicki Genfan
Antony Genn (The Mescaleros, The Hours)
Dave Genn (Matthew Good Band)
Lowell George (The Mothers of Invention, Little Feat)
Rocky George (Suicidal Tendencies)
Janick Gers (Iron Maiden)
Per Gessle (Gyllene Tider, Roxette)
Andy Gibb
Barry Gibb (Bee Gees)
Maurice Gibb (Bee Gees)
Ben Gibbard (Death Cab for Cutie, The Postal Service, ¡All-Time Quarterback!)
Billy Gibbons (ZZ Top)
Gilberto Gil
Paul Gilbert (Mr. Big, Racer X)
João Gilberto
Daniel Gildenlöw (Pain of Salvation)
Nick Gilder (Sweeney Todd)
Brad Gillis (Night Ranger)
David Gilmour (Pink Floyd)
Vince Gill (Pure Prairie League)
Gordon Giltrap
Greg Ginn (Black Flag)
Chad I Ginsburg (CKY)
Mauro Giuliani
George Gobel
Nicolas Godin (Air)
Mircea Gogoncea
Lynval Golding (The Specials)
Sander Gommans (After Forever)
Pier Gonella (Mastercastle–Necrodeath)
Adam Gontier (Three Days Grace)
Dave Gonzalez (The Paladins, Hacienda Brothers)
José González
Pedro Javier González
Myles Goodwyn (April Wine)
Nina Gordon (Veruca Salt)
Martin Gore (Depeche Mode)
Scott Gorham (Thin Lizzy)
Grisha Goryachev
Chris Goss (Masters of Reality)
Stone Gossard (Green River, Mother Love Bone, Temple of the Dog, Pearl Jam)
Manuel Göttsching (Ash Ra Tempel)
Johnny Goudie (Goudie)
Ellie Goulding
Barry Goudreau (Boston)
Guthrie Govan
Laura Jane Grace (Against Me!)
Gerhard Graf-Martinez
Davey Graham
Amy Grant
James Grant (Love and Money)
Rocky Gray (Soul Embraced)
Jay Graydon
Doug Grean
Boris Grebenshchikov (Aquarium)
Dallas Green (Alexisonfire, City and Colour)
Freddie Green (Count Basie)
Gary Green (Gentle Giant)
Grant Green
Peter Green (Fleetwood Mac)
Ted Greene
Norman Greenbaum
Alex Greenwald (Phantom Planet)
Brian Greenway (April Wine, Mashmakhan)
Jonny Greenwood (Radiohead)
Dave Gregory (XTC)
David Grier
Ryan Griffiths (The Vines)
Carl Johan Grimmark (Narnia, Rob Rock, Saviour Machine, Beautiful Sin)
Dave Grohl (Foo Fighters, Nirvana)
Stefan Grossman
Luther Grosvenor (Spooky Tooth)
Todd Grubbs
Lalo Guerrero
Guinga
Michael Gulezian
Trey Gunn (King Crimson), (David Sylvian)
Tracii Guns (L.A. Guns, Guns N' Roses, Brides of Destruction)
Brett Gurewitz (Bad Religion, Error)
James Gurley (Big Brother and the Holding Company)
Michael Gurley (Dada)
Gus G (Firewind)
Buddy Guy

H

Steve Hackett (Genesis, GTR, Squackett)
Amir-John Haddad
Sammy Hagar (Van Halen, Chickenfoot, The Circle)
Ivar Haglund
Bill Haley (Bill Haley and His Comets)
GP Hall
Jim Hall
Kristen Hall (Sugarland)
Johan Hallgren (Pain of Salvation)
Mary Halvorson
Mike Hamilton (Kenny Loggins, Peter Kater, Jay Ferguson)
Page Hamilton (Helmet)
Shannon Hamm (Death, Control Denied)
Chuck Hammer (Lou Reed, David Bowie, Guitarchitecture)
Kirk Hammett (Metallica)
Peter Hammill (Van der Graaf Generator)
Albert Hammond, Jr. (The Strokes)
Michael Hampton (Funkadelic)
Jeff Hanneman (Slayer)
Brian Haner Sr.
Frank Hannon (Tesla)
Andrew Hansen
Kai Hansen (Gamma Ray)
Isaac Hanson (Hanson)
Joel Hanson (PFR)
Fareed Haque (Garaj Mahal)
Bob Hardy (Franz Ferdinand)
Bill Harkleroad (Captain Beefheart and his Magic Band)
Jessica Harp (The Wreckers)
Ben Harper
Nick Harper
Roy Harper
Dhani Harrison (thenewno2)
George Harrison (The Beatles)
Jerry Harrison (Talking Heads)
Mark Hart (Supertramp, Crowded House)
Bob Hartman (Petra)
Les Harvey (Stone the Crows)
PJ Harvey
Pye Hastings (Caravan)
Charlotte Hatherley (Ash)
Ian Haug (Powderfinger)
Dan Hawkins (The Darkness)
Justin Hawkins (The Darkness)
Nick Hawkins (Big Audio Dynamite II)
Colin Hay (Men at Work)
Hiroyuki Hayashi (Polysics)
Peter Hayes (Black Rebel Motorcycle Club)
Warren Haynes (The Allman Brothers Band, Gov't Mule)
Dave Haywood (Lady Antebellum)
Eddie Hazel (Funkadelic)
Pete Haycock (Climax Blues Band)
Justin Hayward (The Moody Blues)
Matt Heafy (Trivium)
Jeff Healey
Kevin Hearn (Barenaked Ladies, Kevin Hearn and Thin Buckle)
Jim "Reverend Horton" Heath
Charles Hedger (Cradle of Filth)
Michael Hedges
Christian Hejnal (Scarling.)
Scott Henderson (Tribal Tech, Vital Tech Tones)
Jimi Hendrix (The Jimi Hendrix Experience, Band of Gypsys, Gypsy Sun and Rainbows)
Masato Hayakawa (Coldrain)
Don Henley (Eagles)
Ken Hensley
James Hetfield (Metallica)
Greg Hetson (Circle Jerks, Bad Religion)
Nick Hexum (311)
MJ Hibbett
Tony Hicks
hide (X Japan)
Johnny Hiland
Steve Hillage
Tyler Hilton
Brent Hinds (Mastodon)
Robert "Bucket" Hingley (The Toasters)
Tom Hingley (Too Much Texas, Inspiral Carpets)
Paul Hinojos (At the Drive-In, The Mars Volta)
Taka Hirose (Feeder)
Joel Hoekstra (Night Ranger, Whitesnake, Rock of Ages (musical))
Jules Hodgson (KMFDM)
Roger Hodgson (Supertramp)
Gary Hoey
Susanna Hoffs (The Bangles)
Wolf Hoffmann (Accept)
James Hogan
Noel Hogan (The Cranberries)
Randy Holden
Allan Holdsworth (U.K.)
Dexter Holland (The Offspring)
Justin Holland
Buddy Holly
Joshua Homme (Kyuss, Queens of the Stone Age)
James Honeyman-Scott (The Pretenders)
Matt Hoopes (Relient K)
Mary Hopkin
Doug Hopkins (Gin Blossoms)
Lightnin' Hopkins
Mark Hoppus (Blink-182, +44)
Keith Hopwood (Herman's Hermits)
Rita Hosking
Tomoyasu Hotei (Boøwy)
Jimmy Hotz
Son House
Michael Houser (Widespread Panic)
Greg Howe
Steve Howe (Tomorrow, Yes, GTR, Asia)
Billy Howerdel (A Perfect Circle)
Keith Howland (Chicago)
C. B. Hudson, (Blue October)
Dann Huff
Jesse Hughes (Eagles of Death Metal)
Steve Hunter (Alice Cooper, Peter Gabriel)
Mississippi John Hurt
Wayne Hussey (The Mission, The Sisters of Mercy)
Eric Hutchinson
Mick Hucknall (Simply Red)
Eugene Hütz (Gogol Bordello)
Hyde (L'Arc-en-Ciel, VAMPS)
Chrissie Hynde (The Pretenders)

I

Scott Ian (Anthrax, Stormtroopers of Death)
Angel Ibarra (Aiden)
Billy Idol
Frank Iero (My Chemical Romance)
James Iha (The Smashing Pumpkins, A Perfect Circle)
Ihsahn (Emperor, Thou Shalt Suffer, Peccatum, Hardingrock)
Chris Impellitteri (Impellitteri)
Frank Infante (Blondie)
Elliot Ingber (The Mothers of Invention, Captain Beefheart and his Magic Band)
Roberto Iniesta (Extremoduro)
Inoran (Luna Sea, Fake?, Tourbillon)
Tony Iommi (Black Sabbath, Heaven & Hell)
Donnie Iris
Chris Isaak
Sharon Isbin
Arve Isdal (Enslaved)
Ichiro Ito (Every Little Thing)
Maja Ivarsson (The Sounds)
Anders Iwers (Ceremonial Oath, In Flames, Cemetary, Lacuna Coil)

J

Matthias Jabs (Scorpions)
Ramon Jacinto
Alan Jackson
Paul Jackson, Jr.
Stevie Jackson (Belle and Sebastian)
Tito Jackson (The Jackson 5)
Brian James (The Damned)
Elmore James
Skip James
Spencer James (The Searchers)
Tony James (Carbon/Silicon)
Phil Jamieson (Grinspoon)
James Williamson
Jandek
Bert Jansch
Al Jardine (The Beach Boys)
Ron Jarzombek
Wyclef Jean
Blind Lemon Jefferson
Stephan Jenkins (Third Eye Blind)
JerryC
Joan Jett (The Runaways, Joan Jett and the Blackhearts)
Antônio Carlos Jobim
Heri Joensen (Týr)
Alain Johannes (Eleven, Queens of the Stone Age)
Lars-Olof Johansson (The Cardigans)
John 5 (Marilyn Manson, Rob Zombie)
Daniel Johns (Silverchair)
Carlos Johnson
Eric Johnson
Jack Johnson
Jimmy Johnson (Muscle Shoals Rhythm Section)
Kelly Johnson (Girlschool)
Mike Johnson (Thinking Plague)
Robert Johnson
Wayne Johnson (The Manhattan Transfer)
Wilko Johnson (Dr. Feelgood)
Blind Willie Johnson
Tom Johnston (The Doobie Brothers)
Vic Johnson (The BusBoys, Sammy Hagar and the Waboritas, The Circle)
Davey Johnstone (Elton John)
Ruud Jolie (Within Temptation)
Nick, Kevin and Joe Jonas (Jonas Brothers)
Adam Jones (Tool)
Buddy Jones
Brian Jones (The Rolling Stones)
Daniel Jones (Savage Garden)
Danny Jones (McFly)
Kelly Jones (Stereophonics)
Mick Jones (Foreigner)
Mick Jones (The Clash, Big Audio Dynamite, Carbon/Silicon)
Rod Jones (Idlewild)
Stacy Jones (American Hi-Fi)
Steve Jones (Sex Pistols)
Stanley Jordan
Joey Jordison (Murderdolls)
Ben Jorgensen (Armor for Sleep)
John Jorgenson
Juanes
Roman Jugg (The Damned)
Sungha Jung
Tyler Joseph (Twenty One Pilots)

K

Ledward Kaapana
Alex Kapranos (Franz Ferdinand)
Andre "Virus" Karkos (Dope, Device)
Billy Karren (Bikini Kill)
Dr Nico Kasanda
Terry Kath (Chicago)
Jorma Kaukonen (Jefferson Airplane)
Ryo Kawasaki
John Kay (Steppenwolf)
Lenny Kaye (Patti Smith Group)
Phil Keaggy
Toby Keith
Bill Kelliher (Mastodon)
Dave Kelly (musician)
Gary Kemp (Spandau Ballet)
Ken Kitamura (L'Arc-en-Ciel)
Big Kenny (Big & Rich)
Mike Kennerty (The All American Rejects)
Barney Kessel
Daniel Kessler (Interpol)
Dave Keuning (The Killers)
Ryan Key (Yellowcard)
Herbert Khaury (Tiny Tim)
Jewel Kilcher
Cheyenne Kimball (Gloriana)
Albert King
B.B. King
Ben King (The Yardbirds)
Dave King (Flogging Molly)
Ed King (Lynyrd Skynyrd)
Freddie King
Justin King
Kaki King
Kerry King (Slayer)
Donald Kinsey (Bob Marley and the Wailers, Peter Tosh)
Bill Kirchen (Commander Cody and His Lost Planet Airmen)
Pat Kirtley
Ezra Koenig (Vampire Weekend)
Kôji Kiriki (Malice Mizer, Eve of Destiny)
Jon Klein (Siouxsie and the Banshees)
Frank Klepacki (I AM, Home Cookin'
Forrest Kline (hellogoodbye)
Josh Klinghoffer (The Bicycle Thief, John Frusciante, Red Hot Chili Peppers)
Scott Klopfenstein (Reel Big Fish, The Littlest Man Band)
Earl Klugh
Larry Knechtel
David Knopfler
Mark Knopfler (Dire Straits)
Jeffrey Kollman (Bombastic Meatbats)
George Kooymans (Golden Earring)
Peter Koppes (The Church)
Alexis Korner
Pasi Koskinen (St. Mucus, Ajattara, To Separate the Flesh from the Bones)
Paul Kostabi (White Zombie)
Leo Kottke
Richie Kotzen
Rocky Kramer
Wayne Kramer (MC5)
Norbert Krief (Trust)
Robby Krieger (The Doors)
Chad Kroeger (Nickelback)
Richard Kruspe (Rammstein)
Andrei Krylov
Jan Kuehnemund (Vixen)
Damian Kulash (OK Go)
Bruce Kulick (Kiss)
Irina Kulikova
Dave Kushner (Wasted Youth, Infectious Grooves, Zilch, Velvet Revolver)
Paul Kossoff (Free)

L

Jesse Lacey (Brand New)
Patrick Lachman (Halford, Damageplan)
Julian Lage
Alexi Laiho (Children of Bodom)
Denny Laine (Paul McCartney, Wings, The Moody Blues, Ginger Baker's Air Force, Colin Blunstone)
Greg Lake (King Crimson, Emerson, Lake & Palmer)
Ler LaLonde (Primus)
Shawn Lane, (Black Oak Arkansas)
Miranda Lambert
Paul Landers (Rammstein)
Yuri Landman
Michael Landau
Jonny Lang
Tito Larriva (The Plugz, Cruzados, Tito & Tarantula)
Marit Larsen
Andrew Latimer (Camel)
Roope Latvala (Children of Bodom)
Hugh Laurie (Fry and Laurie)
Antonio Lauro
Adam Lazzara (Taking Back Sunday)
Bernie Leadon (Eagles)
Fin Leavell (The Summer Obsession, Nightswim, Against All Authority)
Derek Leckenby (Herman's Hermits)
John LeCompt ( Evanescence)
Albert Lee
Alex Lee (Placebo)
Alvin Lee (Ten Years After)
Jake E. Lee
Shane Lee (Six & Out)
Thomas Leeb
Troy Van Leeuwen (Queens of the Stone Age, A Perfect Circle)
Sébastien Lefebvre (Simple Plan)
Adrian Legg
John Lennon (The Beatles)
Julian Lennon
Sean Lennon
Stefano Lentini
Deke Leonard (Man (band))
Lettie
Jared Leto (Thirty Seconds to Mars)
Adam Levine (Maroon 5, Kara's Flowers)
Vaden Todd Lewis (Toadies)
Aaron Lewis (Staind)
Bob Lewis (Devo)
Matty Lewis (Zebrahead)
Herman Li (DragonForce)
Ottmar Liebert
Alex Lifeson (Rush)
Jani Liimatainen (Cain's Offering, Sonata Arctica)
John Lilley (The Hooters)
Rickey Lime (Scarling.)
Charley Lincoln
Hal Lindes (Dire Straits)
David Lindley
Peter Lindgren (Opeth)
Mikko Lindström (HIM)
Buzzy Linhart
Jeff Linsky
Sead Lipovača (Divlje jagode)
Kerry Livgren (Kansas)
Duncan Lloyd (Maxïmo Park)
Lazer Lloyd
Richard Lloyd (Television)
Robert Lockwood, Jr.
Chuck Loeb
Lisa Loeb
Pete Loeffler (Chevelle)
Nils Lofgren (E Street Band)
Karl Logan (Manowar)
Kenny Loggins
John Lombardo (10,000 Maniacs, John & Mary)
Jeff Loomis (Nevermore, Sanctuary)
Dang Ngoc Long 
Joe Long (The Four Seasons)
Sami Lopakka (Sentenced)
Courtney Love (Hole)
Demi Lovato
Clint Lowery (Sevendust, Dark New Day)
Scott Lucas (Local H)
Paco de Lucía
Steve Lukather (Toto)
Jean-Baptiste Lully
George Lynch (Dokken)
Jeff Lynne (The Move, Electric Light Orchestra, Traveling Wilburys)
Jimmy Lyon (Eddie Money, The Greg Kihn Band)
Bob Log III

M

Tony MacAlpine
Alick Macheso 
Lonnie Mack
Brian "Too Loud" MacLeod (Chilliwack, Headpins)
Doug Macleod
Wade MacNeil (Alexisonfire)
Benji Madden (Good Charlotte)
 Madonna
Jari Mäenpää (Wintersun, Ensiferum)
Taj Mahal (musician)
Raine Maida (Our Lady Peace)
Wolf Mail
Daron Malakian (System of a Down, Scars on Broadway)
Stephen Malkmus (Pavement)
Gui Mallon
Yngwie Malmsteen
Russell Malone
Mana Mana (Moi dix Mois, Malice Mizer)
Harvey Mandel (Canned Heat)
Julian Mandrake, (Canvas, Blue October)
James Mankey (Concrete Blonde)
Phil Manzanera (Roxy Music)
Kee Marcello (Easy Action, Europe, Kee Marcello's K2)
Carlo Marchione
Frank Marino (Mahogany Rush)
Steve Marker (Garbage)
Bob Marley (Bob Marley and the Wailers)
Del Marquis (Scissor Sisters)
Johnny Marr (The Smiths, Modest Mouse)
Steve Marriott (Small Faces, Humble Pie)
Mick Mars (Mötley Crüe)
Bernie Marsden (UFO (band), Whitesnake)
Gerry Marsden (Gerry and the Pacemakers)
James Marsters
Billy Martin (Good Charlotte)
Chris Martin (Coldplay)
Jeff Martin (The Tea Party)
Jim Martin (Faith No More)
Pat Martino
Dave Martone
John Martyn
Hank Marvin (The Shadows)
J Mascis (Dinosaur Jr.)
James Maslow
Brent Mason
Dave Mason
Lucio Matarazzo
Tak Matsumoto (B'z)
Dave Matthews (Dave Matthews Band)
Lee Mavers (The La's)
Brian May (Queen)
John Mayer
Sonny Mayo (Snot, Hed PE, Amen, Sevendust)
Steve Mazur (Our Lady Peace)
Nick McCabe (The Verve)
Ian McCallum (Stiff Little Fingers)
John McCarthy
Nick McCarthy (Franz Ferdinand)
Paul McCartney (The Beatles), (Wings)
Chris McCaughan (The Lawrence Arms)

George McConnell (Beanland, Kudzu Kings, Widespread Panic)
Andy McCoy (Hanoi Rocks)
Hugh McCracken
Mike McCready (Pearl Jam)
Danny McCulloch (The Animals)
Jimmy McCulloch (Wings, Thunderclap Newman, Stone the Crows, Small Faces, The Dukes)
Henry McCullough (Éire Apparent, the Grease Band, Spooky Tooth, Wings)
Jennette McCurdy
Richie McDonald
Mississippi Fred McDowell
Eric McFadden (Eric Burdon)
John McFee (The Doobie Brothers, Southern Pacific)
John McGeoch (Magazine, Visage, Siouxsie and the Banshees, Public Image Ltd, The Armoury Show)
Tim McGraw
Roger McGuinn (The Byrds)
Tim McIlrath (Rise Against)
James McIlroy (Cradle of Filth)
Duff McKagan (Guns N' Roses, Velvet Revolver, Neurotic Outsiders)
Al McKay (Earth, Wind & Fire)
John McKay (Siouxsie and the Banshees)
Andy McKee
Sarah McLachlan
John McLaughlin (Mahavishnu Orchestra)
Troy McLawhorn (Dark New Day, Evanescence)
Tony McManus
El McMeen
John McNally (The Searchers)
Tony McPhee (The Groundhogs)
Dave McPherson (InMe)
Michelle Meldrum (Phantom Blue, Meldrum)
Colin Meloy (The Decemberists)
Katie Melua
Eric Melvin (NOFX)
Wendy Melvoin
Shawn Mendes
Johann Kaspar Mertz
Italo Meschi
Memphis Minnie
Eddie Mesa
Naser Mestarihi
Pat Metheny (Pat Metheny Group)
Jesse Michaels (Operation Ivy, Common Rider)
Alyson Michalka (78violet)
Amanda Michalka (78violet)
Darren Middleton (Powderfinger)
Qaasim Middleton (Nat & Alex Wolff)
Radomir Mihailović (Smak)
Tomo Miličević (Thirty Seconds to Mars)
Amy Millan (Stars)
Deron Miller (CKY)
Dominic Miller (Phil Collins)
Jerry Miller (Moby Grape)
Marcus Miller
Roger Miller (Mission of Burma)
Steve Miller (Steve Miller Band)
Nuno Mindelis
Ben Mink
Federico Miranda (Gandhi)
Roman Miroshnichenko
Tom Misch
Joni Mitchell
Kim Mitchell
Miyavi (Skin)
Jim Moginie (Midnight Oil)
Brian Molko (Placebo)
MonaLisa Twins
Michael Monarch (Steppenwolf)
Erik Mongrain
Wes Montgomery
Carlos Montoya
Ronnie Montrose (Montrose, Gamma)
Ben Moody (Evanescence)
Gary Moore (Thin Lizzy, Skid Row)
Nathan Moore (Surprise Me Mr. Davis, ThaMuseMeant)
Scotty Moore
Thurston Moore (Sonic Youth)
Vinnie Moore (UFO), (Vicious Rumors)
Craig Morgan
Shaun Morgan (Seether)
Rafael Moreira
Tom Morello (Rage Against the Machine, Audioslave, The Nightwatchman)
Marc Moreland (Wall of Voodoo, The Skulls)
Chino Moreno (Deftones)
Ruthie Morris (Magnapop)
Sterling Morrison (The Velvet Underground)
Steve Morse (Dixie Dregs, Kansas, Deep Purple)
Howard Moss
Jason Moss (Cherry Poppin' Daddies)
Bob Mothersbaugh (Devo)
Bob Mould (Hüsker Dü)
Xavier Moyano
Jason Mraz
Alonso Mudarra
Maury Muehleisen
Cameron Muncey (Jet)
Billy Mure
James Murphy (Death, Testament)
Matt "Guitar" Murphy
Dave Mustaine (Megadeth, Metallica)
Dave Murray (Iron Maiden)
Brad Myers
Zach Myers (Shinedown)
Gary Myrick (Havana 3am)

N

Jimmy Nail
Miyu Nagase (Zone)
Randy Napoleon
Graham Nash (Crosby, Stills, Nash & Young)
Dave Navarro (Jane's Addiction, Red Hot Chili Peppers, The Panic Channel, Camp Freddy)
Joe Negri
Simon Neil (Biffy Clyro, Marmaduke Duke)
Ricky Nelson
Willie Nelson
Michael Nesmith (The Monkees)
Mike Ness (Social Distortion)
Ira Newborn
Carl Newman (The New Pornographers)
Grant Nicholas (Feeder)
Craig Nicholls (The Vines)
Rick Nielsen (Cheap Trick)
Willie Nile
John Nolan (Straylight Run, Taking Back Sunday)
Noodle (Gorillaz)
Noodles (The Offspring)
Paul Noonan (Bell X1)
Aaron North (The Icarus Line, Nine Inch Nails)
John Norum (Europe, Dokken)
Bradley Nowell (Sublime)
Ted Nugent (The Amboy Dukes, Damn Yankees)

O

Ed O'Brien (Radiohead)
Mark O'Connor
Richard Oakes (Suede)
John Oates (Hall & Oates)
Ric Ocasek (The Cars)
Frank Ocean
Erkan Oğur
Eddie Ojeda (Twisted Sister)
Kele Okereke (Bloc Party)
André Olbrich (Blind Guardian)
Mike Oldfield
Criss Oliva (Savatage)
Stefan Olsdal (Placebo)
Ami Onuki (Puffy AmiYumi)
Jason Orange (Take That)
Roy Orbison
Orianthi
Marc Orrell (Dropkick Murphys)
Jim O'Rourke
Roland Orzabal (Tears for Fears)
Buzz Osborne (Melvins, Venomous Concept)
Emily Osment
Steve Ouimette
Ryo Owatari (Do As Infinity, Missile Innovation)

P

Niccolò Paganini
Jimmy Page (The Yardbirds, Led Zeppelin, The Firm)
Steven Page (Barenaked Ladies, The Vanity Project)
Clive Painter (Broken Dog, The 99 Call, Tram (band), The Real Tuesday Weld)
Brad Paisley
John Paiva (Frankie Valli and the Four Seasons)
Orianthi Panagaris
Jett Pangan (The Dawn)
Paulinho Nogueira
Richard Palmer (Supertramp)
Rick Parfitt (Status Quo)
Charlie Parra del Riego
Russ Parrish (Steel Panther)
Andy Partridge (XTC)
Joe Pass
Pata (X Japan)
Ralph Patt
Pappo
Les Paul
Tom Paxton
Ryan Peake (Nickelback)
Jeff Pearce (Hearts of Space, William Ackerman)
Paco Peña
Mike Pender (The Searchers)
Kirk Pengilly (INXS)
Patrick Pentland (Sloan)
Raymond "East Bay Ray" Pepperell (Dead Kennedys)
Heitor Teixeira Pereira (Simply Red)
Franky Perez (Scars on Broadway)
Andreas Paolo Perger
Carl Perkins
Luther Perkins (The Tennessee Three)
Christina Perri
Joe Perry (Aerosmith, The Joe Perry Project)
Linda Perry (4 Non Blondes)
Eric Peterson (Testament)
Vicki Peterson (The Bangles)
Gregori Chad Petree (Shiny Toy Guns)
John Petrucci (Dream Theater)
Tom Petty (Tom Petty and the Heartbreakers, Traveling Wilburys)
 Dave Peverett (Foghat)
Liz Phair
River Phoenix (Aleka's Attic)
Jonny Phillips (musician) (Oriole)
Anthony Phillips (Genesis)
Yannis Philippakis (Foals)
Yosi Piamenta (Yosi Piamenta)
Frank Pilato
Dave Pino (Andrew W.K., Waltham (band), Damone (band), Powerman 5000)
Al Pitrelli (Savatage, Trans-Siberian Orchestra, Asia, Megadeth)
Jake Pitts (Black Veil Brides)
Bucky Pizzarelli
Sergio Pizzorno (Kasabian)
Joel Plaskett (Thrush Hermit, Joel Plaskett Emergency)
Dean Pleasants (Suicidal Tendencies)
Morris Pleasure (Sideman)
Chris Poland (Megadeth)
Nick Pollock (Alice N' Chains, My Sister's Machine)
Alberto Ponce
Iggy Pop
Ana Popović
Jody Porter (Fountains of Wayne)
Michael Poulsen (Dominus, Volbeat)
Andy Powell (Wishbone Ash)
Baden Powell
Chet Powers (Quicksilver Messenger Service)
Kid Congo Powers (The Gun Club, The Cramps, Nick Cave and the Bad Seeds)
Dougie Poynter (McFly)
Christophe Pratiffi
Sam Prekop (The Sea and Cake)
Elvis Presley
Igor Presnyakov (Iggypres)
Prince
Jade Puget (Redemption 87, AFI)
Martin Pugh (Steamhammer, Armageddon, 7th Order) 
Gian Pyres (Cradle of Filth)

Q

Robert Quine (Lou Reed)

R

Raphael Rabello
Ronald Radford
Eddie Rabbitt
Trevor Rabin (Yes)
Gerry Rafferty
Melvin "Wah-Wah Watson" Ragin
Bonnie Raitt
Mick Ralphs (Mott the Hoople, Bad Company)
Eros Ramazzotti
Johnny Ramone (Ramones)
Federico Ramos
Val Ramos
Lee Ranaldo (Sonic Youth)
Elliott Randall
Jimmy Raney
Søren Rasted (Aqua)
Marion Raven
Chris Rea
Ray Reach
Jaret Reddick (Bowling for Soup)
Dusty Redmon
Lou Reed (The Velvet Underground)
Preston Reed
Vernon Reid (Living Colour)
William Reid (The Jesus and Mary Chain)
Vini Reilly (The Durutti Column)
Django Reinhardt
Keith Relf (Renaissance)
Emily Remler
John Renbourn
Tim Renwick (Al Stewart)
Marco Restrepo
Paul Reynolds (A Flock of Seagulls)
Sheldon Reynolds (Commodores, Earth, Wind & Fire)
Tim Reynolds (TR3, Dave Matthews Band)
Trent Reznor (Nine Inch Nails)
Randy Rhoads (Quiet Riot, Ozzy Osbourne)
Red Rhodes
Marc Ribot (Tom Waits, The Lounge Lizards)
Damien Rice
Tony Rice
John Rich (Lonestar, Big & Rich)
Cliff Richard
Keith Richards (The Rolling Stones)
Max Richards (The Bonfire of the Vanities)
Gary Richrath (REO Speedwagon)
Michael Ricketts
Mike Riggs (Rob Zombie, Scum of the Earth)
Marc Riley (The Fall)
Rafael Riqueni
Lee Ritenour
Jesse Rivest
Janet Robin
Jason Roberts (Norah Jones, Hymns (band), The Candles)
Allison Robertson (The Donnas)
Brian Robertson (Thin Lizzy, Motörhead)
Ed Robertson (Barenaked Ladies)
Robbie Robertson (The Band)
Rowan Robertson  (Dio, Bang Tango)
Rich Robinson  (The Black Crowes)
Andrea Rocca
Nile Rodgers
Olivia Rodrigo
Flavio Rodrigues
Silvio Rodríguez
Omar Rodríguez-López (At the Drive-In, De Facto, The Mars Volta)
Donald "Buck Dharma" Roeser (Blue Öyster Cult)
Roy Rogers (singing cowboy)
Roy Rogers (slide guitarist)
Lawson Rollins
Tony Rombola (Godsmack)
Michael Romeo (Symphony X)
Pepe Romero
Joe Romersa
Ludovico Roncalli
Patrick Rondat (Jean-Michel Jarre, Elegy)
Mick Ronson (David Bowie)
Joe Don Rooney (Rascal Flatts)
Jim Root (Slipknot, Stone Sour)
Axl Rose
Kurt Rosenwinkel
Andy Ross (OK Go)
Don Ross
Ryan Ross (The Young Veins, Panic! at the Disco)
Gavin Rossdale (Bush, Institute)
Francis Rossi (Status Quo)
Gregory Doc Rossi
Gary Rossington (Lynyrd Skynyrd)
Robert Roth (Truly)
Uli Jon Roth (Scorpions)
Steve Rothery (Marillion, The Wishing Tree)
Martin Rotsey (Midnight Oil)
Andy Rourke
Spookey Ruben
Darius Rucker (Hootie & the Blowfish)
Javier Ruibal
Todd Rundgren (Nazz, Utopia, The New Cars)
Otis Rush
David Russell
Kamil Rustam
Erik Rutan (Hate Eternal)
Mike Rutherford (Genesis, Mike + The Mechanics)
Paul Ryan (Origin)
Terje Rypdal
Johnny Rzeznik (Goo Goo Dolls)

S

Sabicas
Greg Sage (Wipers)
Maggie Sajak
Flavio Sala
Stevie Salas (George Clinton)
Richie Sambora (Bon Jovi)
Samoth (Emperor, Thou Shalt Suffer, Arcturus, Satyricon, Zyklon-B, Zyklon, Scum)
Claudio Sanchez (Coheed and Cambria)
Justin Sandercoe
Justin Sane (Anti-Flag)
Manolo Sanlúcar
Carlos Santana (Santana)
Adam Sandler
Tommy Sands (American singer)
Tommy Sands (Irish singer)
Giuliano Sangiorgi (Negramaro)
Joey Santiago (Pixies, The Martinis)
Blues Saraceno
Yağmur Sarıgül (maNga)
Satchel (Steel Panther)
Manabu Satô (Malice Mizer, Moi dix Mois)
Joe Satriani (Chickenfoot)
Boz Scaggs (Steve Miller Band)
Matt Scannell (Vertical Horizon)
Craig Scanlon (The Fall)
Roger Scannura
Wes Scantlin (Puddle of Mudd)
Jon Schaffer (Iced Earth)
Kendall Schmidt
Marcus Siepen (Blind Guardian)
Michael Schenker
Rudolf Schenker (Scorpions)
Helge Schneider
Al Schnier (moe.)
Tom Scholz (Boston)
Neal Schon (Journey, Santana, Bad English)
Chuck Schuldiner (Death, Control Denied, Voodoocult)
Knut Schreiner (Euroboy)
Robert Schwartzman (Rooney)
Blake Schwarzenbach (Jawbreaker, Jets to Brazil)
John Scofield
Andy Scott (Sweet)
Dominic Scott (Keane)
Howard E. Scott (War)
Keith Scott (Bryan Adams)
Bob Seger
Andrés Segovia
John Sekula (Mushroomhead, State of Conviction)
Anna Sentina
Gabe Serbian (Cattle Decapitation, Holy Molar)
Wayne Sermon (Imagine Dragons)
Juan Serrano
Leo Setiawan (Kekal)
Brian Setzer (Stray Cats, The Brian Setzer Orchestra)
Charlie Sexton
James Shaffer (Korn)
Del Shannon
Tommy Shannon
Dave Sharp (The Alarm, Stiff Little Fingers)
Elliott Sharp
Todd Sharpville
Kim Shattuck (The Muffs, The Pandoras)
Tommy Shaw (Styx, Damn Yankees)
Ed Sheeran
Pete Shelley (Buzzcocks)
Blake Shelton
Louis Shelton
Kenny Wayne Shepherd
Nick Sheppard (The Cortinas, The Clash, Head)
Rodney Sheppard (Sugar Ray)
Rabbi Shergill
Jeff Sherman (Glass)
Billy Sherwood
Kevin Shields (My Bloody Valentine)
Scott Shields (The Mescaleros)
Chris Shiflett (No Use for a Name, Me First and the Gimme Gimmes, Foo Fighters)
Mike Shinoda (Linkin Park)
Drew Shirley (Switchfoot)
Jon Siebels (Eve 6)
Alejandro Silva
Patrick Simmons (The Doobie Brothers)
Charlie Simpson (Fightstar)
Matt Skiba (Alkaline Trio)
Tim Sköld (Marilyn Manson)
Alex Skolnick (Testament, Savatage, Trans-Siberian Orchestra)
Skwisgaar Skwigelf (Dethklok)
Acey Slade (Trashlight Vision, Dope, Murderdolls)
Mike Slamer (City Boy)
Slash (Guns N' Roses, Slash's Snakepit, Velvet Revolver, Slash's Blues Ball, Road Crew)
Martin Slattery (The Mescaleros)
Hillel Slovak (Red Hot Chili Peppers, What Is This?)
Brendon Small
Pat Smear (Germs, Nirvana, Foo Fighters)
Adrian Smith (Iron Maiden)
Bennie Smith
Elliott Smith
Fred "Sonic" Smith (MC5, Sonic's Rendezvous Band)
G. E. Smith (Hall & Oates)
Johnny Smith
Keith Smith (Anarchy Club)
Kenn Smith
Mindy Smith
Patti Smith
Paul Smith (Maxïmo Park)
Robert Smith (The Cure, Siouxsie and the Banshees)
Tom Smothers
Toti Soler
Fernando Sor
Donita Sparks (L7)
Jordin Sparks
Larry Sparks (The Stanley Brothers, Clinch Mountain Boys)
Tim Sparks
Chris Spedding
Bob Spencer (Skyhooks), (The Angels)
Mary Spender
Spirit
Dan Spitz (Anthrax)
Bill Spooner (The Tubes)
Rick Springfield
Bruce Springsteen (Bruce Springsteen and the E Street Band)
Trey Spruance (Mr. Bungle, Secret Chiefs 3, Faith No More)
Lester Square (The Monochrome Set)
Billy Squier
John Squire (The Stone Roses)
Kapil Srivastava
David St. Hubbins (Spinal Tap)
Layne Staley (Alice in Chains)
Mark Stanley
Paul Stanley (KISS)
Mikael Stanne)
Jack Starr
Wayne Static (Static-X)
Tommy Steele
Vlatko Stefanovski (Leb i sol)
Chris Stein (Blondie)
Ken Steorts (Skillet)
Leigh Stephens (Blue Cheer, Foxtrot)
Edward Stephenson
Mike Stern (Blood, Sweat & Tears)
Travis Stever (Coheed and Cambria)
Cat Stevens
Rogers Stevens (Blind Melon)
Steve Stevens (Billy Idol)
James Stevenson
Al Stewart
Allan Stewart (Idlewild)
Eric Stewart (10cc, The Mindbenders, Hotlegs)
John Stewart (The Kingston Trio)
Rod Stewart (The Jeff Beck Group, The Faces)
Stephen Stills (Buffalo Springfield, Crosby, Stills, Nash & Young)
Bob Stinson (The Replacements)
Andrew Stockdale (Wolfmother)
Barry Stock (Three Days Grace)
Jason Stollsteimer (The Von Bondies)
Freddie Stone (Sly and the Family Stone)
Mike Stone (Queensrÿche)
Izzy Stradlin (Guns N' Roses)
George Strait
Emily Strayer (The Chicks)
Joel Stroetzel (Killswitch Engage)
Jesper Strömblad (In Flames)
Joe Strummer (The Clash)
Daryl Stuermer (Genesis, Phil Collins)
Patrick Stump (Fall Out Boy)
Ron Strykert (Men at Work)
Alex Suarez (Cobra Starship)
Sugizo (Luna Sea, S.K.I.N., X Japan)
Frankie Sullivan (Survivor)
Big Jim Sullivan
Hubert Sumlin (Howlin' Wolf)
Andy Summers (Eric Burdon & The Animals), (The Police)
Bernard Sumner (Joy Division, New Order)
Øystein Sunde
Niklas Sundin (Dark Tranquillity)
Bryan Sutton
Peter Svensson (The Cardigans)
Dan Swanö
Steve Swanson
Matthew Sweet
Michael Sweet (Stryper)
Taylor Swift
Rob Swire (Pendulum, Knife Party)
Jussi Sydänmaa (Lordi)
John Sykes (Thin Lizzy, Whitesnake)
Ken Sykora
Red Symons (Skyhooks)
Gábor Szabó
Tony Sly (No Use For A Name)

T

Ty Tabor (King's X)
Toquinho
Fred Tackett (Little Feat)
Joey Tafolla (Jag Panzer)
Akira Takasaki (Loudness)
Serj Tankian
Marv Tarplin (The Supremes, The Miracles)
Francisco Tárrega
Evan Taubenfeld (Avril Lavigne)
Andy Taylor (Duran Duran)
Corey Taylor (Stone Sour)
Courtney Taylor-Taylor (The Dandy Warhols)
Graeme Taylor (Gryphon)
Joanne Shaw Taylor
John Taylor (Duran Duran)
Martin Taylor
Melvin Taylor
Mick Taylor (John Mayall & the Bluesbreakers, The Rolling Stones)
Otis Taylor
Ryan Tedder (OneRepublic)
Susan Tedeschi
Bobby Tench (Hummingbird A&M)
Miika Tenkula (Sentenced)
Octave Octavian Teodorescu
Teye
Thomas Thacker (Gob, Sum 41)
Ron "Bumblefoot" Thal (Guns N' Roses)
Kim Thayil (Soundgarden)
Sister Rosetta Tharpe
Tommy Thayer (Kiss)
Toots Thielemans
Amy Thiessen
Matt Thiessen (Relient K, Matthew Thiessen and the Earthquakes)
Lynda Thomas
Randy Thomas (musician) (Sweet Comfort Band, Allies)
Rob Thomas (Matchbox Twenty)
Hughie Thomasson (Outlaws)
Porl Thompson (The Cure)
Richard Thompson (Fairport Convention)
Mick Thomson (Slipknot)
Ian Thornley (Thornley, Big Wreck)
Blair Thornton (Bachman–Turner Overdrive)
George Thorogood
Johnny Thunders (The Heartbreakers)
Glenn Tilbrook (Squeeze)
Andy Timmons (Danger Danger)
Glenn Tipton (Judas Priest)
Paul Tobias (Guns N' Roses)
Timo Tolkki (Stratovarius)
Tomatito
Simon Tong (The Verve, The Good, the Bad & the Queen)
Peter Tork (The Monkees)
Ray Toro (My Chemical Romance)
Sam Totman (DragonForce)
Ralph Towner (Oregon)
Mark Lee Townsend (DC Talk)
Devin Townsend (Strapping Young Lad, The Devin Townsend Band)
Pete Townshend (The Who)
Simon Townshend (The Who, Casbah Club)
Pat Travers
Merle Travis
Randy Travis
Mark Tremonti (Alter Bridge, Creed)
Joseph Trohman (Fall Out Boy)
John Tropea
Robin Trower (Procol Harum)
Derek Trucks (The Allman Brothers Band, The Derek Trucks Band)
Nicholas Tse
Corin Tucker (Heavens to Betsy, Sleater-Kinney)
Nigel Tufnel (Spinal Tap)
KT Tunstall
Luca Turilli (Rhapsody of Fire)
John Turnbull (The Blockheads)
Alex Turner (Arctic Monkeys)
Ike Turner (Kings of Rhythm, Ike & Tina Turner Revue)
Mike Turner (Our Lady Peace, Fair Ground)
Josh Turner
Joshua Lee Turner
Steve Turner (Mudhoney, Green River)
Tweet (singer)
Dan Tyminski (Alison Krauss)
Olli Tukiainen (Poets of the Fall)

U

Keith Urban (The Ranch)
Brendon Urie (Panic! at the Disco)
Midge Ure (Slik, Rich Kids, Thin Lizzy, Ultravox, Visage)
Farin Urlaub (Die Ärzte, Soilent Grün, King Køng)
Björn Ulvaeus (ABBA)

V

Steve Vai (Frank Zappa, Alcatrazz, Whitesnake)
Adrian Vandenberg (Vandenberg, Whitesnake)
Pierre Van Dormael
George Van Eps
Eddie Van Halen (Van Halen)
Steve Van Zandt (E Street Band)
Donnie Van Zant (38 Special)
Ritchie Valens
Nick Valensi (The Strokes)
Hilton Valentine (The Animals)
James Valentine (Maroon 5)
Sergio Vallín (Maná)
Randy VanWarmer
Mike Varney (Outlaws)
Jimmie Vaughan
Stevie Ray Vaughan (Stevie Ray Vaughan and Double Trouble)
Eddie Vedder (Pearl Jam)
Suzanne Vega
Zacky Vengeance (Avenged Sevenfold)
Virginia Vera
John Verity (Argent, Charlie)
Tom Verlaine (Television)
Henry Vestine (Canned Heat)
Ana Vidović
Viktor Vidović
Brian Viglione (The Dresden Dolls, The World/Inferno Friendship Society)
Frank Vignola
Elias Viljanen (Sonata Arctica)
Jacky Vincent (Falling In Reverse)
Vinnie Vincent (KISS)
Lee Ving (Fear)
Kate Voegele
Mark Volman
Cody Votolato (The Blood Brothers)
Rocky Votolato (Waxwing)
Emppu Vuorinen (Nightwish)

W

Paul Waaktaar-Savoy (a-ha)
Waddy Wachtel
Jason Wade (Lifehouse)
Paul Waggoner (Between the Buried and Me)
Rufus Wainwright
Dave Wakeling (The Beat, General Public)
Patrick Walden (Babyshambles)
Billy Walker
Butch Walker
David T. Walker
Geordie Walker (Killing Joke)
Jon Walker (The Young Veins, Panic! at the Disco)
T-Bone Walker
Chris Walla (Death Cab for Cutie)
John Bruce Wallace
Gordon Waller (Peter and Gordon)
Denny Walley (The Mothers of Invention, Captain Beefheart and his Magic Band, Frank Zappa)
Joe Walsh (James Gang, Eagles)
Rich Ward (Fozzy)
Baz Warne (The Stranglers)
Sean Watkins (Nickel Creek)
Doc Watson
Jeff Watson (Night Ranger)
Stan Webb (Chicken Shack)
Michael Weber
Tim Weed
Dean Ween (Ween)
Gene Ween (Ween)
John Weider (Eric Burdon & The Animals)
Dave Weiner (Steve Vai)
Jona Weinhofen (I Killed The Prom Queen, Bring Me the Horizon, Bleeding Through)
Bob Weir (Grateful Dead)
Bob Welch (Fleetwood Mac)
Brian Welch (Korn)
Bruce Welch (The Shadows)
Paul Weller (The Jam, The Style Council)
John Wesley (Porcupine Tree)
Leslie West (Mountain)
Jim West ("Weird Al" Yankovic)
Robert Westerholt (Within Temptation)
Tim Wheeler (Ash)
Clarence White (The Kentucky Colonels, Nashville West, The Byrds, Muleskinner)
Deryck Whibley (Sum 41)
Andrew White (Kaiser Chiefs)
Bukka White
Jack White (The White Stripes, The Raconteurs)
Jason White (Green Day, Pinhead Gunpowder)
Josh White
Peter White
Snowy White (Thin Lizzy, Pink Floyd, Roger Waters, David Gilmour)
Steve White (PIG, KMFDM)
Vince White (The Clash)
Brad Whitford (Aerosmith)
Slim Whitman
John "Charlie" Whitney (Family, Streetwalkers)
Buddy Whittington (John Mayall & the Bluesbreakers)
Jonny Wickersham (Youth Brigade, U.S. Bombs, Social Distortion)
Jane Wiedlin (The Go-Go's)
Clarence Wijewardena
David Wilcox
Harlow Wilcox
Webb Wilder
Jack Wilkins
Brad Allen Williams
Bernie Williams
Hayley Williams (Paramore)
Jody Williams
John Williams
Mason Williams
Rich Williams (Kansas)
Pete Willis (Def Leppard)
Marty Willson-Piper (The Church)
Alan Wilson (Canned Heat)
Carl Wilson (The Beach Boys)
Charles White (The Gentle Men)
Nancy Wilson (Heart)
Steven Wilson (Porcupine Tree, No-Man, Blackfield)
Michael Wilton (Queensrÿche, Soulbender)
Johnny Winter
Steve Winwood (The Spencer Davis Group, Traffic, Blind Faith, Go)
Christian Olde Wolbers (Fear Factory)
Howlin' Wolf
Bobby Womack
Wong Ka Kui (Beyond)
Paul Wong (Beyond)
Sigurd Wongraven (Satyricon)
Craig Wood (Avril Lavigne, Gob)
Ron Wood (Small Faces, The Jeff Beck Group, The Rolling Stones)
Bob Wootton (The Tennessee Three)
Link Wray
Owen Wright (Mistrust, My Sister's Machine)
Zakk Wylde (Pride & Glory, Black Label Society, Ozzy Osbourne)

Y

Kyoji Yamamoto (Bow Wow)
Kazuhito Yamashita
Narciso Yepes
Taylor York (Paramore)
Thom Yorke (Radiohead)
Pete Yorn
Yumi Yoshimura (Puffy AmiYumi)
Angus Young (AC/DC)
James "JY" Young (Styx)
Jeff Young (Megadeth)
Malcolm Young (AC/DC)
Neil Young (Buffalo Springfield, Crosby, Stills, Nash & Young)
YUI
Yael Yuzon (Sponge Cola)

Z

Roy Z (Rob Rock, Bruce Dickinson)
Buddy Zabala (Eraserheads, The Dawn)
Aamir Zaki
Robin Zander (Cheap Trick)
Dweezil Zappa
Frank Zappa (The Mothers of Invention)
Roy Zimmerman
Nick Zinner (Yeah Yeah Yeahs)
Billy Zoom (X)

See also 

 List of bass guitarists
 List of classical guitarists
 List of jazz guitarists
 List of lead guitarists
 List of rhythm guitarists
 List of slide guitarists

References

Lists of guitarists
Guitar